Euryeulia biocellata is a species of moth of the family Tortricidae. It is found at altitudes of 1,290 to 1,850 meters in the Sierra Madre Occidental of western Mexico. The habitat consists of pine-oak forests.

The length of the forewings is 5.9–7.2 mm for males and 8 mm for females. The ground colour of the forewings is grey, with transverse, grey-brown lines, bordered by pale yellow. Adults have been recorded on wing from August to September.

References

Moths described in 1914
Euliini